Esport Oilers is a floorball team based in Espoo, Finland, that competes in F-liiga, the top flight of Finnish floorball. The team plays its home matches in Tapiolan urheiluhalli, which has a seating capacity of 1,570.

During their inaugural season, Esport Oilers was known as Espoon Oilers. It was renamed in 2013, in order to highlight the club's cooperation with Esport, a fitness center and gym company. Esport Oilers is the second biggest floorball club in Finland with 1040 licensed players.

Honours
 Salibandyliiga titles
 1998–99, 2001–02, 2002–03, 2005–06
 Suomen Cup titles
 1995–96, 2001–02

Players

Records

Team records 

 Biggest win: Oilers - Classic 18-4 (2 November 2005)
 Biggest loss: Oilers - SPV 2-11 (31 January 2015)
 Regular season attendance record: 3214 Oilers - TPS 4-1 (9 December 2009)
 Most goals scored in league history: 4303 (1994–2020)
 Most points in league history: 944 (1994–2020)
 Most wins in a season: 28 (2005-2006)
 Most goals scored in a season: 333 (2005-2006)
 Best goal difference in a season: +152 (333-181 2005–2006)
 Most saved penalty shots in a season: 8 (2007-2008)

Individual records 

 Most points in a season: 48+60=108 (Jaakko Hintikka 2005–06)
 Most goals in a season: 63 (Tero Tiitu 2005–06)
 Most PP assists in a season: 16 (Matias Kaartinen 2012–2013)
 Most goals scored in PK in a season:7 (Tero Tiitu 2005–2006)
 Most assists in PK in a season:6 (Jaakko Hintikka 2005–2006)
 Fastest opening goal: 0.03 (Casper Pfitzner, Jussi Piha 12 January 2011)

References

External links
 

Finnish floorball teams
Sport in Espoo
1990 establishments in Finland